A Chorus of Disapproval is a 1989 British film adapted from the 1984 Alan Ayckbourn play of the same title, directed by Michael Winner. Among the films's cast are Anthony Hopkins, Jeremy Irons, Richard Briers, and Alexandra Pigg.

Plot
The story follows a young widower, Guy Jones, as he joins an amateur operatic society that is putting on The Beggar's Opera. He rapidly progresses through the ranks to become the male lead, while simultaneously conducting liaisons with several of the female cast.

Cast and characters
 Jeremy Irons – Guy Jones
 Anthony Hopkins – Dafydd Ap Llewellyn
 Prunella Scales – Hannah Ap Llewellyn
 Jenny Seagrove – Fay Hubbard
 Sylvia Syms – Rebecca Huntley-Pike
 Gareth Hunt – Ian Hubbard
 Patsy Kensit – Linda Washbrook
 Lionel Jeffries – Jarvis Huntley-Pike
 Alexandra Pigg – Bridget Baines
 Richard Briers – Ted Washbrook
 Barbara Ferris – Enid Washbrook
 Pete Lee-Wilson – Crispin Usher
 David King – Mr. Ames
 Amanda Mainard – Woman in Theatre
 Dinah May – Girl at Work
 Anne Priestley – Hilda Shaw
 Audrey Trotter – Mrs. Bawden

Filming Locations

The main filming locations in Scarborough were:

 Scarborough Railway Station - Guy arrives in Scarborough at the beginning and leaves for Blackpool at the end
 Duke of York Guest House, 1-2 Merchants Row, off Eastborough, Scarborough - Guy's lodgings
 Castle Community Centre, East Sandgate - the cast rehearse The Beggar's Opera
 Royal Opera House [now demolished], St Thomas Street  - the cast rehearse and then perform The Beggar's Opera in the theatre

Reception
Time Out gave A Chorus of Disapproval a negative review, stating that most of the film's cast  "can't cope with either the heavily truncated script or Winner's cloddish, half-baked direction."

References

External links
 
 
 

1989 films
British musical comedy-drama films
1980s English-language films
Films based on works by Alan Ayckbourn
Scarborough, North Yorkshire
Films shot in North Yorkshire
Films set in Yorkshire
Films directed by Michael Winner
Films scored by John Du Prez
1980s musical comedy-drama films
Films with screenplays by Michael Winner
Films about opera
Films produced by Michael Winner
1980s British films